Elder Don is an album by American saxophonist Don Wilkerson recorded in 1962 and released on the Blue Note label. It was recorded a month before Preach Brother!, but released later.

Reception

Jazz critic Harvey Pekar had this to say in his May 23, 1963 review for Down Beat magazine: "Though not an innovator, the leader is a respectable musician. His style is an amalgam of many sources..."

The Allmusic review by Stephen Thomas Erlewine awarded the album 4½ stars and stated "records like this go a long way in proving that Wilkerson was one of the great underrated saxophonists of his time".

Track listing
All compositions by Don Wilkerson except as indicated

 "Señorita Eula" - 4:52
 "San Antonio Rose" (Bob Wills) - 7:45
 "Scrappy" - 4:51
 "Lone Star Shuffle" - 6:52
 "Drawin' a Tip" - 4:44
 "Poor Butterfly" (John Golden, Raymond Hubbell) - 5:41

Personnel
Don Wilkerson - tenor saxophone
John Acea - piano
Grant Green - guitar
Lloyd Trotman - bass
Willie Bobo - drums

References

Blue Note Records albums
Don Wilkerson albums
1962 albums
Albums produced by Alfred Lion
Albums recorded at Van Gelder Studio